Belmullet GAA Irish: CLG Béal an Mhuirthead is a Gaelic Athletic Association club located in Belmullet, County Mayo, Ireland.

Achievements
 All-Ireland Junior Club Football Championship Runners-Up 2002
 Connacht Junior Club Football Championship Winners 2002
 Mayo Senior Football Championship Runners-Up 1945, 1981
 Mayo Intermediate Football Championship Winners 1974, 2018
 Mayo Junior Football Championship Winners 2001
 Mayo Senior Hurling Championship Winners 1957
 '''Craobh Uile éireann Comórtas Peile na Gaeltacht 2006, 2010

Notable players
 Billy Joe Padden
 Willie Joe Padden (2 Time All Star Winner in 1985 and 1989)
 Chris Barrett (All Star Winner in 2017)
Ryan O’Donoghue
Ronan Murray (former EFL footballer for Ipswich Town, League of Ireland winner with Dundalk in 2018)

References

External sources
Club Website

Gaelic football clubs in County Mayo
Hurling clubs in County Mayo
Gaelic games clubs in County Mayo